Macquoid is a surname. Notable people with the surname include:

 Josh McQuoid (born 1989), British semi-professional footballer
 Katharine Sarah Macquoid (1824–1917), British novelist and travel writer
 Percy Macquoid (1852–1925), British theatrical designer and historian